Olezoa is a neighborhood of the city of Yaoundé, capital of Cameroon, located in the district of Yaoundé 3.

History 
Olezoa means "Shrub for elephants". Originally it was called Elig Omgba Alima Kie "former stronghold of omgba Alima Kie", a Mvog Atemengue. It was common to Emveng and Mvog Atemengue. For others, it means "the rice of zogo" in reference to the superior chief manguissa who was a rice farmer and was chosen by the colonial administration to experiment with rice cultivation.

Geography 
Olezoa is a neighborhood located in the south of the city of Yaoundé. It is bordered to the north by the Elig Belibi neighborhood, to the south by Dakar and Mvolyé, and to the east by Mvog Atangana Mbala and Ndamvud. It is also commonly known as "l'ile de France". It is the hydronym of a 5 km long stream that takes its source behind the amphitheater 700 of the University of Yaoundé 1 Ngoa Ekelle, a tributary of the right bank of the Mfundi River.

Institutions 
The district is home not only to the French Embassy, but also to the residence of several French diplomatic and military personnel posted in Cameroon, as well as the Ministry of Defense (MINDEF).

Education 

 Fustel-de-Coulanges French Primary School
 Olezoa Public School

Places of worship 
Olezoa chapel with the name of Saint-Paul parish

Popular places 

 Carrefour trois statues
 Mobil Olezoa

Health 

 Military hospital
 Veterinary pharmacy
 Pharmacy of Olezoa

References